Claus-Detlev Walter Kleber (born 2 September 1955 in Reutlingen) is a German journalist and former lawyer. He anchored heute-journal, an evening news program on ZDF, one of Germany's two major public TV stations. He is also known for his expertise in United States politics and German-American relations, as evidenced by his 2005 bestseller Amerikas Kreuzzüge ("America's Crusades").

Early life 

Claus Kleber was born in Reutlingen, Germany. He attended the Otto Hahn Gymnasium in Bergisch Gladbach, completing his Abitur in 1974. During his schooling, Kleber freelanced as a local reporter for the newspaper Kölner Stadt-Anzeiger. From 1974, he studied law at the University of Tübingen, spending two semesters abroad in Lausanne, Switzerland in 1978 and 1979. In the autumn of 1980, Kleber passed his first Staatsexamen in law: this was followed by further training in Stuttgart. In 1983 he completed his second Staatsexamen, followed by extended dissertation research stays in New York City and Washington, D.C., for which he was awarded scholarships from Studienstiftung and DAAD. After this, he worked as a lawyer for a law firm in Stuttgart, specializing in commercial law and competition law. In 1986, he completed his PhD in law under Thomas Oppermann at the University of Tübingen.

Career

Radio and television 

Kleber financed his 14 semesters of studying law as a free-lancing radio reporter and anchor for SWF (a public service station). After completing his PhD, Kleber became a journalist and worked during the 1980s as a Washington correspondent for Deutschlandfunk (DLF), a German public broadcaster. In the spring of 1989, Kleber returned to Germany as Chief Editor of RIAS, a major broadcaster in  Berlin under the control of the United States Information Agency.

From 1990 he worked for 12 years as Senior Correspondent and Bureau Chief for ARD, one of the two nationwide German public television networks. There he got interviews with all US Presidents in that period. Donald Rumsfeld and Colin Powell. In June 2002, Kleber moved as ARD Bureau Chief to London.

A few months into the new job, he received an offer to become managing editor and principal anchor of heute journal, the 30 minute late evening news show of ZDF, the other public television channel beside the ARD. one of Germany's leading television news programs. In 2014, he interviewed US President Barack Obama. In June 2021, he announced that he would leave ZDF at the end of the year.

Documentaries 
Kleber is also a documentary filmmaker. With his long-standing professional partner, Angela Andersen, he has created documentary films, including India – Unstoppable (2006) for the DVD-market.

They later also made Documentaries for broadcasting, such as The Bomb (2009), about nuclear threats in the 21st century, Machtfaktor Erde (2011) on climate change. HUNGER! and DURST! (thirst) is a 2-part documentary (2014) showcased globally the challenge and efforts to feed a 10 billion –humanity by 2050.

2019, their 90min report on the situation of Human Rights (Unantastar / Inviolable) won Silver New York Film Festival 2017 and was nominated for Best Documentary at the Monaco Film Festival.

2021, ZDF aired "We have the better story" Kleber's 40-minute conversation with US president Barack Obama about his achievements and shortcomings.

Books
Kleber's book Amerikas Kreuzzüge ("America's crusades") won the 2005 Corine Literature Prize for best non-fiction work. Shortly before the 2008 presidential election, Kleber published an updated edition with his views on the candidates. In 2012 Kleber published Spielball Erde about global strategic consequences of Climate Change.

Further information 
Since 2015, Claus Kleber also works as an Honorary Professor at his alma mater, the University of Tübingen. He is a member of Atlantik-Brücke, an invitation-only organisation promoting cultural, economic and military co-operation between Germany and the USA.

Recognition 
Kleber is the recipient of several awards, including the Media prize of the Johanna Quandt Foundation (1998) for excellence in economic reporting, the RIAS Berlin committee TV prize (1997, 1999 and 2003), and the Deutscher Fernsehpreis (the German equivalent of the American Emmy) in 2005, 2006 and 2013 (heute journal as best German news program). Claus Kleber and his ZDF partner anchor Marietta Slomka were awarded the prestigious Grimme Prize in 2009 for their merits on the evolution of television. In 2010, he won the Hanns Joachim Friedrichs Award for Outstanding Journalism. His work in documentaries on global challenges (with Angela Andersen) received the Deutscher Fernsehpreis for The Bomb in 2009 and the Bayerischer Fernsehpreis for HUNGER! DURST! in 2015. In a 2018 survey conducted by Forsa Institute, he was voted Germany's most trusted news presenter.

Awards 

 1998: Preis der RIAS Berlin Kommission für die Fernsehproduktion Pioneer Square (ARD-Studio Washington zusammen mit Tom Buhrow, Sabine Reifenberg)
 1999: Fernsehpreis der RIAS Berlin Kommission für die Produktion Oh Gott, Amerika! Glaube, Seelen, Scharlatane (ARD-Studio Washington zusammen mit Tom Buhrow, Georg Kellermann, Sabine Reifenberg)
 1999: Herbert Quandt Medien-Preis der Johanna-Quandt-Stiftung
 2004: Hildegard von Bingen Prize for Journalism
 2004: Fernsehpreis der RIAS Berlin Kommission für die Produktion Allmacht Amerika. Die Welt im Griff (ZDF, zusammen mit der Filmemacherin Angela Andersen)
 2005: Corine, internationaler Literaturpreis für das Buch Amerikas Kreuzzüge – Was die Weltmacht treibt
 2006: Carl-Schurz-Plakette der State Legislative Leaders Foundation
 2005: Deutscher Fernsehpreis für die beste Moderation einer Informationssendung
 2006: Deutscher Fernsehpreis für die Moderation der „Besten Informationssendung“ (ZDF spezial: Krieg ohne Ende)
 2006: Luchs des Monats (Juli) für das Jugendbuch Nachrichten, die Geschichte machten. Von der Antike bis heute
 2008: Nominierung für den Bambi 2008 (Kategorie Moderation)
 2008: Politikjournalist des Jahres 2008 von Medium Magazin
 2009: Adolf-Grimme-Preis des Jahres 2009 – Besondere Ehrung des Deutschen Volkshochschul-Verbandes (gemeinsam mit Marietta Slomka)
 2009: Deutscher Fernsehpreis für die beste Reportage (Die Bombe), gemeinsam mit Angela Andersen
 2010: Hanns Joachim Friedrichs Preis für Fernsehjournalismus
 2010: Krawattenmann des Jahres
 2013: Goldene Kamera (Beste Information – Bester Anchorman)
 2013: Karl-Carstens-Preis des Freundeskreis der Bundesakademie für Sicherheitspolitik e. V.
 2015: Bayerischer Fernsehpreis zusammen mit Angela Andersen als Autoren der zweiteiligen Dokumentation Hunger! Durst! (ZDF)
 2017: Schöne Neue Welt – Wie Silicon Valley unsere Zukunft bestimmt, Silver World Medal. New York Film Festival 2017, nominiert „Beste Dokumentation“ beim TV Festival Monte Carlo, Special Selection „Science Film Festival“

Bibliography

Kleber, Claus and Paskal, Cleo (2012). Spielball Erde. Machtkämpfe im Klimawandel. (in German) (original ed.). München: C. Bertelsmann Verlag. .

External links 
 Portrait at zdf.de (German)

References

1955 births
Living people
People from Reutlingen
Jurists from Baden-Württemberg
German journalists
German male journalists
20th-century German journalists
21st-century German journalists
German male writers
German broadcast news analysts
ZDF people